CCGS Vector is a hydrographic survey vessel in the Canadian Coast Guard. The ship was constructed in Canada and entered service in 1967 as a coastal research vessel on the West Coast. The ship is currently in service, based at Canadian Coast Guard Base Patricia Bay in Sidney, British Columbia.

Description
The vessel is powered by Caterpillar 3408 geared diesel engine creating  and two Caterpillar 3306 generators driving one controllable pitch propeller and bow thrusters.
The survey vessel has a complement of 13, with 5 officers and 8 crew, along with 8 additional berths.

Service history
Vector was constructed by Yarrow Shipyards at their yard in Victoria, British Columbia. The ship was laid down in September 1966 and given the yard number 293. Vector was launched on 23 May 1967 and completed in November later that year. The ship entered service on the West Coast in 1967 for coastal hydrographic research use. The ship is based at the Institute for Ocean Sciences in Sidney, British Columbia.

Notes

Citations

Sources
  
 
 
 
 

Ships of the Canadian Coast Guard
1967 ships
Ships built in British Columbia
Research vessels of Canada